Maruca is a genus of moths of the family Crambidae, commonly known as bean pod borers.

Species
Maruca amboinalis (C. Felder, R. Felder & Rogenhofer, 1875)
Maruca fuscalis Yamanaka, 1998
Maruca nigroapicalis de Joannis, 1930
Maruca vitrata (Fabricius, 1787)

References

Spilomelinae
Moths of Japan
Crambidae genera
Taxa named by Francis Walker (entomologist)